Spitzerberg Airport is a private use airport in Hundsheim, Lower Austria, Austria. The airport is located at the foot of the Spitzerberg. Part of the runway is included in the Spitzerberg nature reserve.

See also
List of airports in Austria

References

External links 
 Airport record for Spitzerberg Airport at Landings.com

Airports in Lower Austria